Shamier Little (born March 20, 1995) is an American track and field sprinter specializing in the 400 metres hurdles. She has won a silver medal in her signature event at the 2015 World Championships. As a 20-year-old college sophomore at Texas A&M University, Little was the 2015 US champion. In July 2021, she became the fifth fastest woman of all time at the event.

Prep
Born in Louisville, Kentucky, Little is the child of athletic parents, her father a football cornerback and her mother a star basketball player and high jumper at Eastern Kentucky University. Shamier began participating in youth track and field as an 8 year old. She made her first appearance at the national level at the 2004 USATF Youth Championships as a 100 meter sprinter running for the University of Chicago Youth Track Club. She regularly participated in all comers track meets. Later Little ran for the Country Club Hills Gazelles both in USATF  and AAU competitions. None of her early youth competitions could be labeled exceptional.

At Robert Lindblom Math & Science Academy in Chicago, Little got more serious setting the IHSA Class 2A records in 100 meters hurdles, 200 meters and 400 meters. She won the 2011 AAU Junior Olympics at 400 hurdles. In 2012, she won the Arcadia Invitational in the 400 meters, which she repeated in 2013.  She won the Junior National Championships in 400 hurdles, which qualified her for the 2012 World Junior Championships in Athletics, but she did not finish the final, falling over the last hurdle while in medal contention.  In 2013, Little tried 100 meters hurdles and 400 at the National Championships, finishing off the podium in both.

Career
After high school, Little chose to go to Texas A&M University. As a freshman, she won the NCAA Championships at 400 hurdles and helped her team get second place in the 4x400 meters relay. Later that summer, she won the 2014 World Junior Championships in the 400 hurdles.

In 2015, before winning the national championship against the big girls, she repeated as NCAA Champion, running the #1 time worldwide to that point in the season. The National Championship offered Little an invitation to run in the 2015 Pan American Games, where she took the gold medal.

In 2016, Little won a third consecutive NCAA 400 m hurdles champion title.

Achievements
All information taken from World Athletics profile.

Personal bests

International competitions

Circuit wins
 Diamond League meetings
 2016 (1) (400 m h): Zürich Weltklasse
 2018 (2) (400 m h): Lausanne Athletissima, London Anniversary Games
 2019 (1) (400 m h): Lausanne Athletissima

References

External links

 

Living people
1995 births
Sportspeople from Louisville, Kentucky
Track and field athletes from Kentucky
American female hurdlers
American female sprinters
African-American female track and field athletes
Pan American Games track and field athletes for the United States
Pan American Games gold medalists for the United States
Pan American Games medalists in athletics (track and field)
Athletes (track and field) at the 2015 Pan American Games
Texas A&M Aggies women's track and field athletes
World Athletics Championships athletes for the United States
World Athletics Championships medalists
USA Outdoor Track and Field Championships winners
Medalists at the 2015 Pan American Games
21st-century African-American sportspeople
21st-century African-American women
20th-century American women
21st-century American women
Robert Lindblom Math & Science Academy alumni